The Pakistan Democratic Party (PDP) was a political party in Pakistan, founded by Nawabzada Nasrullah Khan in June 1967. Nawbzada Nasrullah Khan led the party until his death in 2003. After Nawab's death, the party's leadership was later taken by his son Nawabzada Mansoor Ahmed Khan who later merged it with  Imran Khan's Pakistan Tehreek-e-Insaf in 2012. It was a major rival during Pakistan's former president, Pervez Musharraf's prsidency due to its affliation with Alliance for Restoration of Democracy (ARD) led by its chief Nawbzada Nasrullah Khan along with PML-N and PPP which was created to campaign for Pakistan’s return to civilian rule after the 1999 military coup led by General Musharraf and was reported to include over a dozen political parties.

Electoral history 
At the legislative elections held on 20 October 2002, the party won 0.29% of the popular vote.

National Assembly elections

Leadership 
 Muhammad Arshad Chaudhry
 Nawaz Gondal, secretary general
 Nawabzada Mansoor Ahmed Khan, chairman of the party
Basharat Mirza, vice-president

References

Political parties in Pakistan
Political parties established in 1967
Political parties disestablished in 2012